José Benítez may refer to:

Politics
 José Benítez (mayor) (c. 1760 – c. 1830), 1800 Spanish military mayor in Ponce, Puerto Rico
 José de Guzmán Benítez (1857–1921), 1901–1902 civilian government mayor of Ponce, Puerto Rico
 José J. Benítez Díaz (1866–1947), 1917–1924 Puerto Rican politician, from Luquillo, Puerto Rico

Sport
 José Benítez (sailor) (born 1949), Puerto Rican sailor
 José Benítez (tennis) (born 1990), tennis player from Paraguay
 José Alberto Benítez (born 1981), Spanish road bicycle racer
 José Cobos Benítez (born 1963), wheelchair basketball athlete from Spain
 José Luis Benítez (born 1971), Mexican Boxer

Other
 José Gautier Benítez (1851–1880), Puerto Rican poet of the Romantic Era
 José María Benítez (1790–1855), Venezuelan physician and botanist